Andreas Takvam (born 4 June 1993) is a Norwegian professional volleyball player. He is a member of the Norway national team. At the professional club level, he plays for Ślepsk Malow Suwałki.

Honours

Clubs
 National championships
 2009/2010  Norwegian Championship, with Nyborg VBK
 2010/2011  Norwegian Championship, with Nyborg VBK
 2011/2012  Norwegian Championship, with Nyborg VBK
 2013/2014  Norwegian Championship, with Nyborg VBK
 2016/2017  German SuperCup, with VfB Friedrichshafen
 2016/2017  German Cup, with VfB Friedrichshafen
 2017/2018  German SuperCup, with VfB Friedrichshafen
 2017/2018  German Cup, with VfB Friedrichshafen
 2018/2019  German SuperCup, with VfB Friedrichshafen
 2018/2019  German Cup, with VfB Friedrichshafen

References

External links
 
 Player profile at PlusLiga.pl 
 Player profile at Volleybox.net

1993 births
Living people
People from Fjell
Sportspeople from Vestland
Norwegian men's volleyball players
Norwegian expatriate sportspeople in Poland
Expatriate volleyball players in Poland
Norwegian expatriate sportspeople in Germany
Expatriate volleyball players in Germany
Effector Kielce players
Ślepsk Suwałki players
Middle blockers